Imam Baqir Mosque is a Shi'a mosque located in Surra, Kuwait City, Kuwait. The prayer hall for men holds 6,000 worshippers, and the women's prayer hall contains about 2,000. In 2011 the imam of the mosque was Sheikh Mustafa. Imam Baqir Mosque is one of the largest Shi'a Mosques in Kuwait. For Friday prayer, most worshippers come in the afternoon. During the Maghreb Prayer about 2,000 Worshippers attend. Construction was started in 2005, and was completed in 2007.

See also
 Mosque
 List of mosques

2007 establishments in Kuwait
21st-century mosques
Buildings and structures in Kuwait City
Mosques completed in 2007
Shia mosques in Kuwait